Actua Soccer 2 (Fox Sports Soccer '99 in North America) is a sports video game developed and published by Gremlin Interactive for PlayStation and Microsoft Windows.

Pixel Games UK announced they would be rereleasing the game via Steam in October 2022.

Reception

The game received mixed reviews on both platforms according to the review aggregation website GameRankings.

The game was a runner-up for "Coaster of the Year" at Computer Gaming Worlds 1999 Premier Awards, which went to Trespasser.

The game sold 250,000 units.

References

1997 video games
Association football video games
Fox Interactive games
Gremlin Interactive games
PlayStation (console) games
Video game sequels
Windows games
Video games developed in the United Kingdom